Dragomir Felba (7 July 1921 – 13 July 2006) was a Serbian actor. He appeared in more than one hundred films from 1948 to 2000.

Selected filmography

References

External links 

1921 births
2006 deaths
Serbian male film actors
Male actors from Skopje
Yugoslav male film actors